Piney Point phosphate plant is an industrial site in Manatee County, Florida and the location of a former fertilizer plant. The land is currently owned by HRK Holdings, which leases portions of the land to industrial tenants under the name Eastport.

In March 2021, a phosphogypsum stack, the dam to the reservoir storing wastewater from phosphate tailings created by from the former plant's operations, began to fail, prompting evacuations on April 1 followed by the governor of Florida issuing a state of emergency on April 3. Contaminated toxic water was discharged into Tampa Bay in an effort to prevent the reservoir's collapse.

Background

Borden Chemical opened an industrial plant on the site in September 1966 to process phosphate, a key ingredient in fertilizer. By 1970, it had been discovered that the plant was dumping waste into Bishop Harbor, resulting in fish kills. The plant changed hands multiple times in the 1980s, beginning with Borden transferring the property to AMAX Phosphate in 1980. AMAX sold the plant in 1986 to FCS Energy, which was absorbed into Consolidated Minerals, Inc. 

By 1988, the plant had changed hands again to Royster Phosphates. In 1989, a leaking storage tank released  of sulfate that prompted evacuations of the area. Two incidents in 1991 released sulfur dioxide and sulfur trioxide into the air, killing three workers and creating an acid cloud that caused 30 people to become ill. The FBI seized company records in 1992.

Mulberry Corporation purchased the plant in 1993 when Royster Phosphates declared bankruptcy. Mulberry ceased operations at the plant in 1999 due to a lack of funds. In January 2001, Mulberry abandoned the property just 48 hours after notifying the government that it could no longer afford to assure environmental security, and days before declaring bankruptcy. The Federal Environmental Protection Agency (EPA) briefly stepped in to oversee the plant, with the property later passing to the Florida Department of Environmental Protection (FDEP) through a court-appointed receivership. In 2004, Hurricane Frances caused a hole in a dike, releasing  of contaminated water. 

The site was purchased from the government by HRK Holdings, LLC in 2006 for $4.3 million with the requirement that they maintain the phosphogypsum stacks and contaminated wastewater left from the former operations of the plant. In 2011, another spill dumped  of contaminated water into Bishop Harbor and Tampa Bay. Bishop Harbor has stricter environmental protections given its Outstanding Florida Water designation.

HRK Holdings filed for Chapter 11 bankruptcy in 2012 citing expenses from the leak the previous year, when HRK had allowed the Manatee County Port Authority to store materials from the dredging of Port Manatee's Berth 12 expansion in reservoirs on the property. Portions of the property were sold to Port Manatee, Thatcher Chemical of Florida, Manatee Bulk Storage, and an affiliate of Mayo Fertilizer and Farm Supply as part of bankruptcy restructuring for HRK. The remaining property is leased by HRK as an industrial park under the name Eastport, with access to Port Manatee, multiple highways, and a rail yard connected directly to the CSX mainline.

In September 2020, WMNF reported on increasing concerns about rising water levels at the site due to rains and the potential of reaching capacity with just one hurricane. In October, Florida environmental advocacy group ManaSota-88 called on the EPA to investigate the site, calling out "increased the risks of a catastrophic failure of their earthen impoundments". 

In February 2021, national and regional environmental groups petitioned the EPA, now under the Biden Administration, to raise environmental protections from phosphogypsum stacks in at least 12 states under the Resource Conservation and Recovery Act and the Toxic Substances Control Act; well-known groups included Center for Biological Diversity, Waterkeeper Alliance, and Sierra Club.

2021 incident
The leak was reported to authorities on March 26 and worsened over the following days. Residents in the area were ordered to evacuate on April 1. Efforts to repair the leaks on April 2 and 3 were unsuccessful, and Florida Governor Ron DeSantis declared a state of emergency for the entire county and wider evacuations were conducted on April 3. An estimated 316 households were within the evacuation zone.

DeSantis toured the site on April 4 and in a press conference stated that the wastewater discharged into Tampa Bay was not considered radioactive, but that it contained phosphorus and nitrogen. Officials said that once the situation has been resolved, they intend to close the site permanently, with the reservoirs drained, filled, and capped. If the contaminated water drains through leaks in the radioactive soil of which the stacks are made, however, that radioactive soil could be carried along with the water and issues arose regarding the condition of the plastic liners used in the stacks.

The commissioners of Manatee County than voted to allow the contaminated water still held in the stacks to be injected into deep wells, which had been banned when proposed previously by an owner of the property. Deep-well injection with contaminated water is a controversial procedure that could adversely affect the aquifer used for agricultural irrigation and drinking water, forever contaminating the water source. Debate among scientists and environmentalists and public concern ensued.

Florida lawmakers have secured $100 million to permanently close Piney Point and clean the site. In August, HRK Holdings LLC was sued by the Florida Department of Environmental Protection (FDEP) for failure to operate the site safely.

References

2021 industrial disasters
Environmental disasters in the United States
Waste disposal incidents in the United States